Ivan Nagy may refer to:
 Ivan Boszormenyi-Nagy (1920–2007), Hungarian-American psychiatrist
 Iván Nagy (director) (1938–2015), Hungarian-American film director
 Ivan Nagy (dancer) (1943–2014), Hungarian dancer